Vivek Chikara is an Indian paralympic archer. He made his debut in 2020 Summer Paralympics and bagged 10th position in male individual recurve archery category. He also won gold medal in Asian Para Championship 2019 with an impressive 7-1 win over China’s Sijun Wang.

See also 

 India at the 2020 Summer Paralympics

References

External links 

 Olympics
 World Archery

Living people
Archers at the 2020 Summer Paralympics
Paralympic archers of India
1990 births